KFRZ is a radio station broadcasting from Green River, Wyoming, serving southwestern Wyoming. Broadcasting a country music format, the station is part of The Radio Network, which includes sister stations KUGR, KYCS, and KZWB. KFRZ broadcasts satellite fed music from Westwood One formerly the Jones Radio Network. Like its sister stations, KFRZ has local news throughout the day, and sports highlights as well. The station is currently owned by Wagonwheel Communications Corp.

Signal
Like its sister FM stations, KFRZ broadcasts from a tower on Wilkins Peak located between Rock Springs and Green River. KFRZ's tower also houses KZWB's transmitter as well. 
KFRZ can be heard throughout Sweetwater County, and in parts of northern Utah. KFRZ's signal begins fading at the Uinta County line to the west. KFRZ was once a class C station, carrying 90,000 watts. It downgraded to C1, carrying 11,000 watts.

References

External links

FRZ
Country radio stations in the United States
Green River, Wyoming
Sweetwater County, Wyoming
Radio stations established in 1998